"When the Wind Blows" is a 1986 song from the soundtrack of the film of the same name, performed by David Bowie and written by Bowie and Erdal Kızılçay. It was released as a single in October 1986 and released digitally in 2007.

Background and recording
Originally, Bowie had intended to write the entire soundtrack for the movie, but after pressure to produce his own original album mounted (he would release Never Let Me Down in 1987), he instead pulled out of the project and only submitted the title track; Pink Floyd alum Roger Waters provided much of the original music for the soundtrack instead. "When the Wind Blows" marked the second contribution from Bowie to a film based on a Raymond Briggs book – he contributed a filmed introduction to The Snowman in 1982. Bowie's song was the result of a collaboration with multi-instrumentalist Erdal Kızılçay, who would work with Bowie for another 10 years on such projects as Never Let Me Down (1987), The Buddha of Suburbia (1993), and Outside (1995).

Reception
The single peaked at UK No. 44, promoted by a video that featured a montage of clips from the film, with Bowie's animated face overlaid. Bowie biographer Nicholas Pegg said that it was a "mystery why this splendidly melodramatic number ... didn't achieve greater chart success."

Other releases
The single release appeared on Never Let Me Down (1995 reissue), in some regions on Best of Bowie (2002), The Platinum Collection (2005), The Best of David Bowie 1980-1987 (2005/2007), which also includes the music video, and Re:Call 4 from the Loving the Alien (1983-1988) box set (2018).

Track listing
Lyrics by David Bowie, music by Bowie and Erdal Kizilcay.

7": Virgin / VS 906 (UK) / VSS 906 (UK) 
 "When the Wind Blows"  – 3:32
 "When the Wind Blows" (Instrumental) – 3:52

12": Virgin / VS 906-12 (UK) 
 "When the Wind Blows" (Extended Mix) – 5:46
 "When the Wind Blows" (Instrumental) – 3:52

Digital Download - 2007 EMI UK (When The Wind Blows EP by David Bowie) 
 "When the Wind Blows" (2002 Remaster) – 3:34
 "When the Wind Blows" (Extended Mix)  – 5:36
 "When the Wind Blows" (Instrumental)  – 3:46

Personnel
David Bowie – vocals, production
Erdal Kızılçay
 David Richards – production

Charts

References

External links

1986 singles
David Bowie songs
Songs written by David Bowie
Song recordings produced by David Bowie
Songs about nuclear war and weapons
Songs written by Erdal Kızılçay
Virgin Records singles